The North Carolina Department of Commerce was formed in 1971 by the North Carolina State Government Reorganization Act.   The department is headed by the Secretary of Commerce, who is appointed by the Governor of North Carolina.  The Secretary is part of the Governor's Cabinet. The chief function of the department is to connect businesses with locations, workforce and infrastructure in North Carolina that businesses need to succeed.  The department also connects local communities with grants and funding sources to attract new business to North Carolina.  The department also staffs and receives policy guidance from: the North Carolina Board of Science, Technology, and Innovation; the NCWorks Commission; and the Rural Infrastructure Authority.

History
The North Carolina Department of Commerce was created in 1971 by the North Carolina State Government Reorganization Act, specifically General Statute 143B, Article 10, Paragraph 143B-427:
"There is hereby recreated and reconstituted a Department to be known as the Department of Commerce, with the organization, powers, and duties defined in Article 1 of this Chapter, except as modified in this Article."

The Reorganization Act was part of an effort to reduce the number of state organizations and improve efficiency in government.  The Department of Commerce is headed by the Secretary, who is selected by the Governor, and serves during the governor's tenure.  The Secretary is one of the members of the Governor's Cabinet.

In its early history, the Department was simply an administrative umbrella providing support for a number of different regulatory agencies, each of which exercised its authority independently. In 1977, the North Carolina General Assembly transferred the state Division of Economic Development from the Natural/Economic Resources department into the Commerce department, among other changes.

Secretaries
The Secretaries of the Department of  Commerce have included:

Included organizations
The following state organizations are included in the Department of Commerce:
 Division of Employment Security (formerly the Employment Security Commission)
 State Savings and Loan Commission
 Banking Commission
 Community Development Council
 Credit Union Division
 Industrial Commission
 Public Staff of the Utilities Commission
 Rural Electrification Authority
 Seafood Industrial Park Authority
 Travel & Tourism Board
 North Carolina Utilities Commission

References

Government of North Carolina
Commerce
State departments of commerce of the United States
Department of Commerce
Organizations based in Raleigh, North Carolina
State departments of economic development in the United States